Isla Tortuga (Tortuga Island) is an island in the Gulf of California, created relatively recently in geologic terms by the volcanism associated with the East Pacific Rise. It lies east-northeast of the city of Santa Rosalía, in Mulegé Municipality. It has a surface area of 11.374 km2 (4.39 sq mi).

Biology
The Tortuga Island rattlesnake (Crotalus tortugensis) is a species endemic to Isla Tortuga — it is found nowhere else. It is very abundant on the island and found everywhere on the island, except in the caldera of the volcano.

References

External links
 Volcanic Ridges off Santa Rosalia, Baja California Sur, Gulf of California

Islands of Baja California Sur
Islands of the Gulf of California
Volcanism of Mexico
Nature reserves in Mexico
Protected areas of Baja California Sur
Uninhabited islands of Mexico